This article serves as an index - as complete as possible - of all the honorific orders or similar decorations received by the Bruneian Royal Family, classified by continent, awarding country and recipient.

Brunei 

They have been awarded :

 Family of Hassanal
 Hassanal Bolkiah
  Royal Family Order of the Crown of Brunei - Darjah Kerabat Mahkota Brunei - D.K.M.B. **
  Family Order of Brunei 1st Class - Darjah Kerabat Laila Utama Yang Amat Dihormati - D.K. (Laila Utama)
  Family Order of Brunei 2nd Class - Darjah Kerabat Seri Utama Yang Amat Dihormati - D.K. (Seri Utama)
  Order of the Islam Religion of the State of Brunei 1st Cl - Darjah Seri Ugama Islam Negara Brunei Yang Amat Bersinar Darjah Pertama - P.S.S.U.B. *
  Order of Splendid Valour 1st Cl - Darjah Paduka Laila Jasa Keberanian Gemilang Yang Amat Cemerlang Darjah Pertama - D.P.K.G. *
  Order of Famous Valour 1st Cl - Darjah Paduka Keberanian Laila Terbilang Yang Amat Gemilang Darjah Pertama - D.P.K.T. *
  Order of the Hero of the State of Brunei 1st Cl - Darjah Pahlawan Negara Brunei Yang Amat Perkasa Darjah Pertama - P.S.P.N.B.
  Order of Loyalty to the State of Brunei 1st Cl - Darjah Setia Negara Brunei Yang Amat Bahagia Darjah Pertama - P.S.N.B.
  Order of Merit of Brunei 1st Cl - Darjah Paduka Seri Laila Jasa Yang Amat Berjasa Darjah Pertama - P.S.L.J.
   Order of the Crown of Brunei 1st Cl - Darjah Seri Paduka Mahkota Brunei Yang Amat Mulia Darjah Pertama - S.P.M.B.
  Order of Gallantry of the State of Brunei 1st Cl - Darjah Perwira Agong Negara Brunei Yang Amat Setia Darjah Pertama - P.A.N.B.
N.B. * decoration founded by the sultan on 1st August 1968 ; ** = decoration founded by the sultan on 15th August 1982

 Raja Isteri Pengiran Anak Hajah Saleha : 
  Recipient of the Royal Family Order of the Crown of Brunei (DKMB) 
  Senior (Laila Utama) of the Family Order of Brunei (DK I)
  Pingat Hassanal Bolkiah Sultan (Sultan Hassanal Bolkiah Medal - PHBS, 1.8.1968)
 Sultan of Brunei Golden Jubilee Medal (5 October 2017).
 Hajah Mariam binti Haji ‘Abdul Aziz, Sultan's second divorced wife
  Recipient of the Royal Family Order of the Crown of Brunei (DKMB)
  First Class (Dato Paduka Seri) of the Most Exalted Order of Famous Valour  (DPKT, 29.11.1996)
  Pingat Hassanal Bolkiah Sultan (Sultan Hassanal Bolkiah Medal - PHBS, 1.8.1968)
 Azrinaz Mazhar binti Hakim Mazhar, Sultan's third wife (m. 2005 - div. 2010) :
  Recipient of the Royal Family Order of the Crown of Brunei (DKMB, 20.8.2005, revoked after divorce)
 Al-Muhtadee Billah, Crown Prince of Brunei (son of Queen Saleha, b. 17 February 1974)
  Recipient of the Royal Family Order of the Crown of Brunei (DKMB, 15.8.1982) 
  First Class (Dato Paduka Seri) of the Most Exalted Order of Famous Valour  (DPKT, 31.5.2004)
  Pingat Hassanal Bolkiah Sultan (Sultan Hassanal Bolkiah Medal - PHBS)
 Sultan of Brunei Golden Jubilee Medal (5 October 2017).
 Pengiran Anak Isteri Pengiran Anak Sarah, his wife
  Senior (Laila Utama) of the Most Esteemed Family Order of Brunei (DK I, 15.7.2005) 
 Sultan of Brunei Golden Jubilee Medal (5 October 2017).
 Abdul Azim, second son of the Sultan (& Mariam, b. 29 July 1982)
  Recipient of the Royal Family Order of the Crown of Brunei (DKMB)
 Sultan of Brunei Golden Jubilee Medal (5 October 2017).
 Abdul Malik, third son of the Sultan {& Queen Saleha, b. 30 June 1983}
  Recipient of the Royal Family Order of the Crown of Brunei (DKMB)
  Pingat Hassanal Bolkiah Sultan (Sultan Hassanal Bolkiah Medal - PHBS).
  Brunei Independence (1.1.1984). 
  Silver Jubilee Medal (4.10.1992).
 Sultan of Brunei Golden Jubilee Medal (5 October 2017).
 Abdul Mateen, fourth son of the Sultan (& Mariam, b. 10 August 1991)
  Recipient of the Royal Family Order of the Crown of Brunei (DKMB)
 Sultan of Brunei Golden Jubilee Medal (5 October 2017).
 Abdul Wakeel, fifth son of the Sultan (& Azrinaz Mazhar Hakim, b. 1 June 2006)
  Recipient of the Royal Family Order of the Crown of Brunei (DKMB)
 Sultan of Brunei Golden Jubilee Medal (5 October 2017).
 Rashidah Sa'adatul Bolkiah, elder daughter of the Sultan (& Queen Saleha, b. 26 July 1969)
  Recipient of the Royal Family Order of the Crown of Brunei (DKMB)
 Sultan of Brunei Golden Jubilee Medal (5 October 2017).
 Muta-Wakkillah Hayatul Bolkiah, second daughter of the Sultan (& Queen Saleha, b. 12 October 1971)
  Recipient of the Royal Family Order of the Crown of Brunei (DKMB)
 Sultan of Brunei Golden Jubilee Medal (5 October 2017).
 Majeedah Nuurul Bulqiah, third daughter of the Sultan (& Queen Saleha, b. 16 March 1976)
  Recipient of the Royal Family Order of the Crown of Brunei (DKMB)
 Sultan of Brunei Golden Jubilee Medal (5 October 2017).
 Hafizah Sururul Bolkiah, fourth daughter of the Sultan (& Queen Saleha, b. 12 March 1980)
  Recipient of the Royal Family Order of the Crown of Brunei (DKMB)
 Sultan of Brunei Golden Jubilee Medal (5 October 2017).
 Azemah Ni'matul Bolkiah, fifth daughter of the Sultan (& Mariam, b. 26 September 1984)
  Recipient of the Royal Family Order of the Crown of Brunei (DKMB)
 Sultan of Brunei Golden Jubilee Medal (5 October 2017).
 Fadzillah Lubabul Bolkiah, sixth daughter of the Sultan (& Mariam, b. 23 August 1985)
  Recipient of the Royal Family Order of the Crown of Brunei (DKMB)
 Sultan of Brunei Golden Jubilee Medal (5 October 2017).
 Ameerah Wardatul Bolkiah, seventh daughter of the Sultan (& Azrinaz Mazhar Hakim, b. 28 January 2008)
  Recipient of the Royal Family Order of the Crown of Brunei (DKMB)
 Sultan of Brunei Golden Jubilee Medal (5 October 2017).

 Family of Mohamed
 Mohamed Bolkiah, first younger brother of Sultan Hassanal Bolkiah :
  Recipient of the Royal Family Order of the Crown of Brunei (DKMB) 
  Senior (Laila Utama) of the Family Order of Brunei (DK I, 1963)
  Pingat Hassanal Bolkiah Sultan (Sultan Hassanal Bolkiah Medal - PHBS, 1.8.1968) 
  Pingat Bakti Laila Ikhlas (Armed Forced Service Medal - PBLI, 1975)
  Pingat Jasa Kebaktian (Meritorius Service Medal - PJK, 1954)
 Sultan of Brunei Golden Jubilee Medal (5 October 2017).
 Pengiran Anak Isteri Pengiran Anak Zariah, his wife :
  Senior (Laila Utama) of the Family Order of Brunei (DK I, 1972), 
  Second Class (Dato Laila Jasa) of the Most Distinguished Order of Merit of Brunei (DSLJ, 1971)
 Sultan of Brunei Golden Jubilee Medal (5 October 2017).

 Family of Sufri
 Sufri Bolkiah, second younger brother of Sultan Hassanal Bolkiah :
  Recipient of the Royal Family Order of the Crown of Brunei (DKMB)
  Senior (Laila Utama) of the Family Order of Brunei (DK I, 1970)
  Junior (Sri Utama) of the Family Order of Brunei (DK II, 1968) 
  Pingat Hassanal Bolkiah Sultan (Sultan Hassanal Bolkiah Medal - PHBS, 1.8.1968)
 Salma, his first wife (m. 1971 - div. 1981) :
  Senior (Laila Utama) of the Family Order of Brunei (DK I, 1972)
 Dayang Hajjah Siti Ruhaizah binti Ibrahim, his second wife (m. 1982 - div. 1986)
 Dayang Hajjah Mazuin binti Hamzah, his third wife (m. 1987 - div. 2003)
  Senior (Laila Utama) of the Family Order of Brunei (DK I, 15.7.1990)
 Pengiran Bini Hajah Faizah binti Dato Haji Nasir, his current wife :
  Senior (Laila Utama) of the Family Order of Brunei (DK I)
 Sultan of Brunei Golden Jubilee Medal (5 October 2017).

 Family of Jefri
 Jefri Bolkiah, third younger brother of Sultan Hassanal Bolkiah :
  Recipient of the Royal Family Order of the Crown of Brunei (DKMB)
  Senior (Laila Utama) of the Family Order of Brunei (DK I, 26.12.1970) 
  Pingat Hassanal Bolkiah Sultan (Sultan Hassanal Bolkiah Medal - PHBS, 1.8.1968)
 Sultan of Brunei Golden Jubilee Medal (5 October 2017).
 Pengiran Anak Isteri Pengiran Norhayati, his wife :
  Senior (Laila Utama) of the Family Order of Brunei (DK I)
  Pingat Hassanal Bolkiah Sultan (Sultan Hassanal Bolkiah Medal - PHBS)
 Sultan of Brunei Golden Jubilee Medal (5 October 2017).

 Family of Masna
 Masna Bolkiah, eldest sister of  Sultan Hassanal Bolkiah :
  Senior (Laila Utama) of the Family Order of Brunei (DK I, 1970)
  Recipient of the Royal Family Order of the Crown of Brunei (DKMB)
 Sultan of Brunei Golden Jubilee Medal (5 October 2017).

 Family of Nor’ain
 Nor’ain Bolkiah, 2nd sister of  Sultan Hassanal Bolkiah :
  Senior (Laila Utama) of the Family Order of Brunei (DK I, 1970)
  Recipient of the Royal Family Order of the Crown of Brunei (DKMB)
 Sultan of Brunei Golden Jubilee Medal (5 October 2017).

Asian honours

Far East  
They have been awarded :

Indonesia 

 Hassanal Bolkiah : Adipurna (or First Class) of the Star of the Republic of Indonesia (22.10.1984)

Japan 

 Hassanal Bolkiah :  Collar of The Supreme Order of the Chrysanthemum (3.4.1984)
 Mohamed Bolkiah, elder brother of Sultan Hassanal Bolkiah : Grand Cordon of the Order of the Rising Sun (2009)

Malaysia, sultanates and states

Malaysia

 Hassanal Bolkiah :
  Honorary Recipient of the Order of the Crown of the Realm (DMN, 9.7.1980)  
  Gallant Commander of the Order of Warriors of the Military Forces (PGAT, 29 October 1986)
 Hajah Mariam binti Haji ‘Abdu’l Aziz, Sultan's second divorced wife  : 
 PMJ of Malaysia (11.4.1987)
 Jefri Bolkiah, third brother of Sultan Hassanal Bolkiah :
  Grand Commander of the Order of the Defender of the Realm  (SMN, 8.4.1989) with title Tun

Sultanate of Johor 

 Hassanal Bolkiah :
  First Class of the Royal Family Order of Johor (DK I, 1980)
 Hajah Mariam binti Haji ‘Abdu’l Aziz, Sultan's second divorced wife  : 
  First Class of the Royal Family Order of Johor (DK I,6.3.1997) 
  Knight Grand Commander of the Order of the Crown of Johor (SPMJ, 11.4.1987)
 Mohamed Bolkiah, elder brother of Sultan Hassanal Bolkiah : 
  Knight Grand Commander of the Order of the Crown of Johor (SPMJ - Dato' Sri Paduka)
 Jefri Bolkiah, third brother of Sultan Hassanal Bolkiah :
  Knight Grand Commander of the Order of the Crown of Johor (SPMJ) with title Dato'''

 Sultanate of Kedah To be completed if any .. Sultanate of Kelantan 

 Hassanal Bolkiah :
  Recipient of the Royal Family Order or Star of Yunus (DK, 3.8.1968)
 Raja Isteri Hajah Saleha : 
  Recipient of the Royal Family Order or Star of Yunus (DK, 7.3.1999)
 Hajah Mariam binti Haji ‘Abdu’l Aziz, Sultan's second divorced wife   :
  Recipient of the Royal Family Order or Star of Yunus (DK, 7.3.1999)

 Sultanate of Negeri Sembilan 

 Hassanal Bolkiah :
  Member of the Royal Family Order of Negeri Sembilan (DKNS, 6.8.1980)

 Sultanate of Pahang 

 Hassanal Bolkiah :
  Member 1st class of the Family Order of the Crown of Indra of Pahang (DK I, 19.5.1984)
 Mohamed Bolkiah, elder brother of Sultan Hassanal Bolkiah : 
  Grand Knight of the Order of Sultan Ahmad Shah of Pahang (SSAP - Datuk Sri)
 Jefri Bolkiah, third brother of Sultan Hassanal Bolkiah :
  Grand Knight of the Order of Sultan Ahmad Shah of Pahang (SSAP) with title Dato' Sri Sultanate of Perak 

 Hassanal Bolkiah :
  Recipient of the Royal Family Order of Perak (DK, 7.8.1988) -- currently : 
 Mohamed Bolkiah, elder brother of Sultan Hassanal Bolkiah : 
  Grand Knight (Dato' Seri) of the Order of Cura Si Manja Kini (the Perak Sword of State, SPCM)  with title Dato' Sri Jefri Bolkiah, third brother of Sultan Hassanal Bolkiah :
  Grand Knight of the Order of Cura Si Manja Kini (the Perak Sword of State, SPCM) with title Dato' Sri -- current ribbon de the decoration : 

 Sultanate of Perlis 

 Hassanal Bolkiah :
  Recipient of the Perlis Family Order of the Gallant Prince Syed Putra Jamalullail (DK, 12.3.1988)

 Sultanate of Selangor 

 Hassanal Bolkiah :
  First Class of the Royal Family Order of Selangor (DK I, 23.11.1987)
 Mohamed Bolkiah, elder brother of Sultan Hassanal Bolkiah : 
  Companion of the Order of Sultan Salah ud-din 'Abdu'l Aziz Shah (SSA, Setia)
 Jefri Bolkiah, third brother of Sultan Hassanal Bolkiah :
  Knight Grand Companion (or Dato' Sri Setia) of the Order of Sultan Salahuddin Abdul Aziz Shah (SSSA) with title of Dato’ Seri Sultanate of Terengganu 

 Hassanal Bolkiah :
  Member of the Supreme Royal Family Order of Terengganu (DKT, 4.10.1992)

 State of Sarawak 

 Hassanal Bolkiah : 
 DUBS of Sarawak (9.3.1989)
 Hajah Mariam binti Haji ‘Abdu’l Aziz, Sultan's second divorced wife  : 
  Knight Commander (Datuk Amar) of the Order of the Star of Hornbill Sarawak (DA) with title Datuk Amar''

Laos 

 Hassanal Bolkiah : Phoxay Lane Xang (28.11.2004)
 Al-Muhtadee Billah, Crown Prince of Brunei : Lian Kiatikhounh Medal of Honour of Laos (22.3.2006)

Pakistan 

 Hassanal Bolkiah : Nishan-e-Pakistan (18.9.1992)

Philippines 

 Hassanal Bolkiah : 
 Raja of the Order of Sikatuna (29.8.1988) 
 Punong Komandante (Chief Commander) of the Philippine Legion of Honor (5.3.1998)
 Al-Muhtadee Billah, Crown Prince of Brunei : Grand Cross of the Order of Lakandula (9.11.2006)
 Mohamed Bolkiah, first younger brother of Sultan Hassanal Bolkiah : Grand Cross of the Order of the Golden Heart  (31.7.2007)

Singapore 

 Hassanal Bolkiah : 
 First class of the Order of Temasek (12.2.1990)
 Military Dintinguished Service Order (DSO, 12.2.1990)
 Al-Muhtadee Billah, Crown Prince of Brunei : Distinguished Service Order (8.5.2006)
 Jefri Bolkiah, third younger brother of Sultan Hassanal Bolkiah : First class of  the Darjah Utama Nila Utama (12.2.1990)

South Korea 

 Hassanal Bolkiah : Grand Order of Mugunghwa (6.4.1984)
 Hajah Mariam binti Haji ‘Abdu’l Aziz, Sultan's second divorced wife  : Grand Order of Mugunghwa (6.4.1984)
 Mohamed Bolkiah, elder brother of Sultan Hassanal Bolkiah : Grand Cross of the Order of Diplomatic Service Merit
 Jefri Bolkiah, third brother of Sultan Hassanal Bolkiah : Grand Order of Mugunghwa and  Grand Cross of the Order of Diplomatic Service Merit

Thailand 

 Hassanal Bolkiah : Order of Rajamitrabhorn (1.11.1988)
 Queen Saleha : Grand Cross of the Order of Chula Chom Klao (26.8.2002) 
 Mohamed Bolkiah, elder brother of Sultan Hassanal Bolkiah : Grand Cross of the Order of the White Elephant 
 Jefri Bolkiah, third brother of Sultan Hassanal Bolkiah : Knight Grand Cordon (Special Class) of the Order of the White Elephant 
 Masna Bolkiah, eldest sister of  Sultan Hassanal Bolkiah : Grand Cross of the Order of the White Elephant

Middle East   
They have been awarded :

Bahrain 

 Hassanal Bolkiah : The Order of Al Khalifa (24.4.1988)

Jordan 

 Hassanal Bolkiah : Order of al-Hussein bin Ali (19.12.1984)
 Raja Isteri Hajah Saleha : Grand Cordon Special Class  of the Supreme Order of the Renaissance (13.5.2008) 
 Hajah Mariam binti Haji ‘Abdu’l Aziz, Sultan's second (divorced) wife  : Grand Cordon Special Class of the Supreme Order of the Renaissance (19.12.1984)
 Azrinaz Mazhar binti Hakim Mazhar, Sultan's third (divorced) wife : Grand Cordon Special Class of the Supreme Order of the Renaissance (13.5.2008)
 Al-Muhtadee Billah, Crown Prince of Brunei : Grand Cordon Special class of the Supreme Order of the Renaissance (13.5.2008)
 Pengiran Anak Sarah, Crown Princess of Brunei : Grand Cordon Special class of the Supreme Order of the Renaissance (13.5.2008)
 Rashida, Sultan's elder daughter : Grand Cordon Special class of the Supreme Order of the Renaissance (13.5.2008)

Kuwait
 Hassanal Bolkiah: Collar of the Order of Mubarak the Great (20.5.2015)

Oman 

 Hassanal Bolkiah : The Civil Order of Oman, First Class (15.12.1984)

Saudi Arabia 

 Hassanal Bolkiah : Collar of the Order of Badr Chain (3.1.1999) 
 Al-Muhtadee Billah, Crown Prince of Brunei : First class of the Order of Abdulaziz al Saud (3.1.1999)
 Jefri Bolkiah, third brother of Sultan Hassanal Bolkiah : First class of the Order of Abdulaziz al Saud (1990)

European honours 
They have been awarded :

France 

 Hassanal Bolkiah : Grand Cross of the Legion of Honour (12.2.1996)

Germany 

 Hassanal Bolkiah : 
 Grand Cross Special Class of the Order of Merit of the Federal Republic of Germany  (30.3.1998)
 Mohamed Bolkiah, elder brother of Sultan Hassanal Bolkiah :
 Grand Cross  of the Order of Merit of the Federal Republic of Germany (16.11.1985)

Netherlands 

 Hassanal Bolkiah : Knight Grand Cross of the Order of the Netherlands Lion  (21.1.2013)  
 Raja Isteri Hajah Saleha : Knight Grand Cross of the Order of the Netherlands Lion (21.1.2013) 
 Al-Muhtadee Billah : Grand Cross of the Order of the Crown (21.1.2013) 
 Pengiran Anak Sarah : Grand Cross of the Order of the Crown (21.1.2013)

Sweden 

 Hassanal Bolkiah : Knight of the Royal Order of the Seraphim (1.2.2004)
 Raja Isteri Hajah Saleha : Member of the Royal Order of the Seraphim (1.2.2004)

Ukraine 

 Hassanal Bolkiah : Member 1st Class of the Order of Prince Yaroslav the Wise (8.3.2004) & Cross of Honour (28.1.2007) 
 Raja Isteri Hajah Saleha : Member 1st Class of the Order of Princess Olga (8.3.2004)

United Kingdom 

 Hassanal Bolkiah, Sultan of Brunei : 
 Honorary Knight Grand Cross of the Order of the Bath (GCB, 4 November 1992) 
 Honorary Knight Grand Cross of the Order of St Michael and St George (GCMG, 29 February 1972) 
 Honorary Companion of the Order of St Michael and St George (CMG, 7 August 1968)
 Al-Muhtadee Billah, Crown Prince of Brunei :
 Honorary Knight Grand Cross of the Royal Victorian Order (GCVO, 17.9.1998)
 Mohamed Bolkiah, elder brother of Sultan Hassanal Bolkiah :
 Honorary Knight Grand Cross of the Order of St Michael and St George (GCMG - 17.9.1998)
 Honorary Commander of the Royal Victorian Order (CVO - 29.2.1972)
 Jefri Bolkiah, third brother of Sultan Hassanal Bolkiah : 
 Honorary Knight Grand Cross of the Royal Victorian Order (GCVO, 3.11.1992)

African honours 
They have been awarded :

Egypt 

 Hassanal Bolkiah : Collar of the Order of the Nile (17.12.1984)
 Hajah Mariam binti Haji ‘Abdu’l Aziz, Sultan's second divorced wife  : Special Class of the Order of the Virtues (17.12.1984)

Morocco 

 Hassanal Bolkiah : Collar of the Order of Muhammad (16.9.1988)
 Jefri Bolkiah, third brother of Sultan Hassanal Bolkiah : First class of the Order of Muhammad

References

Notes 

Brunei